John David Kent is a country band based out of Celeste, TX. Consisting of John David Kent, also known as John Kent, formerly of the late 1990s post-grunge band Radish, and other North Texas natives Randall Fuller, Tony Kent, and Colton Gilbreath.

Background Information 
After John's stint recording and touring with Radish, Ben Kweller, and The Lemonheads, he relocated back to his hometown of Celeste, TX to form Blackland Records and open "The Vault" Recording Studio. John began to write songs of his own and formed the band Pony League which is now defunct but then put together John David Kent. The band's self-titled first album, released on May 17, 2011, is available on iTunes. Their sophomore album was released in 2013.

Discography
 John David Kent (2009, Blackland Records)
 Before The Sun Comes Up (2013, Roustabout Records/Blackland Records)

External links
 Official CMT Page

References

Country music groups from Texas
People from Celeste, Texas